Ian Eduardo Escobar Ibáñez (born 29 May 1996) is an Argentine professional footballer who plays as a left-back for Aldosivi, on loan from Talleres.

Career
Escobar's first club was Chacarita Juniors, he began playing for the Primera B Nacional club's senior team during the 2015 season. He made his professional debut in August 2015 in a 1–0 loss to Guillermo Brown, which was the first of thirty appearances in two campaigns with Chacarita Juniors. In July 2016, Escobar was signed by newly-promoted Argentine Primera División side Talleres. His first appearance arrived on 25 September versus Banfield at the Estadio Mario Alberto Kempes. On 14 January 2019, Escobar joined San Martín on loan. After breaking contract with San Martin before the start of the Primera Nacional 2020, Escobar joined Godoy Cruz on 2 November 2020.

On 3 January 2022, Escobar joined Banfield on a one-year loan with a purchase option. However, he didn't play as much as expected, why it was confirmed on 14 July 2022, that the spell had been terminated and that Escobar instead had joined fellow league club, Aldosivi, on a loan until the end of 2023 with a purchase option. In his fourth appearance for Aldosivi, Escobar collided with Lanús player Iván Cazal's head, and was brought to the hospital with an ambulance.

Career statistics
.

References

External links

1996 births
Living people
People from Moreno Partido
Argentine footballers
Association football defenders
Primera Nacional players
Argentine Primera División players
Chacarita Juniors footballers
Talleres de Córdoba footballers
San Martín de San Juan footballers
Godoy Cruz Antonio Tomba footballers
Club Atlético Banfield footballers
Aldosivi footballers
Sportspeople from Buenos Aires Province